Moss Rose is a 1947 American film noir mystery film directed by Gregory Ratoff and starring Peggy Cummins, Victor Mature and Ethel Barrymore. It is an adaptation of the 1934 novel Moss Rose by Marjorie Bowen based on a real-life Victorian murder case.

Plot
Set in Victorian London, the story concerns a music hall chorus girl, Belle Adair, aka Rose Lynton, who blackmails a gentleman, Michael Drego, after seeing him leave the house where another dancer, Daisy Arrow, was found murdered. Instead of accepting money she demands to be invited to the man's stately home to experience the life of a lady. The woman becomes friends with the man's mother, Lady Margaret Drego, and his fiancée, Audrey Ashton, but her peace is disturbed when Inspector Clinner, played by Vincent Price, arrives to question them further about the murder. Then another murder is committed in similar circumstances.

Cast
 Peggy Cummins as Belle Adair aka Rose Lynton
 Victor Mature as Michael Drego
 Ethel Barrymore as Lady Margaret Drego
 Vincent Price as Police Inspector R. Clinner
 Margo Woode as Daisy Arrow
 George Zucco as Craxton, the butler
 Patricia Medina as Audrey Ashton
 Rhys Williams as Deputy Inspector Evans
 John Rogers as Fothergill 
 Patrick O'Moore as George Gilby
 Billy Bevan as White Horse Cabby (uncredited)
 Al Ferguson as Constable (uncredited)
 Gerald Oliver Smith as Hotel Clerk (uncredited)
 John Goldsworthy as Minister (uncredited)
 Stuart Holmes as 	Pompous English Colonel (uncredited)

Production
20th Century Fox announced they had paid their highest ever price for the screen rights to a 1934 novel by Marjorie Bowen for Moss Rose, but did not specify how much. The film was immediately assigned to Peggy Cummins, who had been fired from Forever Amber.

"Ethel Barrymore was in it", Vincent Price said. "I was terrified of her until one day between takes she waddles up and whispers, ‘Got a smoke?’"

Reception

Box-office
The film was a commercial disappointment. Darryl F. Zanuck called it "a catastrophe, for which I blame myself. Our picture was not as good as the original script and the casting was atrocious. The property lost $1,300,000 net."

Critical response
When the film was released, The New York Times film critic, Bosley Crowther, praised the film, writing, "Readers of thriller fiction have been talking for quite some time about a writer called Joseph Shearing, whose many period mysteries are said to have a flavor and distinction all their own. And now it appears that film-goers will have reason to join the claque, if all of this author's output is as adaptable as the first to reach the screen. For Moss Rose, the first of several promised Shearing films, which hit the Roxy yesterday, is a suave and absorbing mystery thriller, neatly plotted and deliciously played ... Thanks to a splendid performance by Peggy Cummins in the role of the girl, there is something to watch when she is acting besides the consequence of the makeup artist's work. Her job as the Cockney chorus girl has spirit, humor and brass—and a surprisingly tender quality which nicely rounds the role."

The staff at Variety magazine also gave the film a positive review.  They wrote, "Moss Rose is good whodunit. Given a lift by solid trouping and direction, melodrama is run off against background of early-day England that provides effective setting for theme of destructive mother love ... Gregory Ratoff's direction develops considerable flavor to the period melodramatics. He gets meticulous performances from players in keeping with mood of piece."

References

External links
 
 
Review of film at Variety
 
 
 

1947 films
1940s historical thriller films
1940s psychological thriller films
1940s mystery thriller films
American historical thriller films
American psychological thriller films
American mystery thriller films
American black-and-white films
Film noir
Films based on British novels
Films set in London
Films set in the 19th century
Films set in the Victorian era
20th Century Fox films
Films directed by Gregory Ratoff
Films scored by David Buttolph
Films with screenplays by Jules Furthman
1940s English-language films
1940s American films